The discography of Nero, a British electronic music act, consists of two studio albums and twenty-one singles.

The trio, Daniel Stephens, Joseph Ray and Alana Watson, released their first official single "Innocence" in the United Kingdom on 26 April 2010. The single was released as a double A-side with the track "Electron". The track peaked at number 167 on the UK Singles Chart. On 6 December 2010, Nero were nominated for the BBC's Sound of 2011 poll.

The nomination was followed by the addition of their second official single "Me & You". The single was released in the UK on 2 January 2011, where it debuted at number 15 on the UK Singles Chart. The trio's third single, "Guilt" made its premiere when Zane Lowe selected it as his Hottest Record in the World on 22 February 2011. The single was released on 24 April 2011, debuting at number 8 in the UK.

"Promises" made its debut on 17 May 2011, when Zane Lowe named it Hottest Record in the World—the third consecutive single from the group to achieve this feat. On 14 August 2011, "Promises" debuted at number 1 in the UK. The London trio's debut album Welcome Reality was released on 15 August 2011, and reached number 1 on the UK Albums Chart. The album's release was later followed with the single "Crush on You" on 13 October 2011. It charted at 32 on the UK Singles Chart. Nero also released "Reaching Out" as a single on 18 December 2011. The last single from the album was "Must Be the Feeling".

Their second studio album Between II Worlds was released on 11 September 2015. The album was preceded by the release of three singles: "Satisfy" in 2014, "The Thrill" in 2015 and "Two Minds" in 2015.

Studio albums

Extended plays

Singles

Remixes

Production credits

Other appearances

References

Discographies of British artists
Electronic music discographies